Normandale Community College is a public community college in Bloomington, Minnesota. The college serves primarily the communities of the southwestern portion of the Minneapolis–Saint Paul metropolitan area. Established in 1968 as Normandale State Junior College with an initial enrollment of 1,358 students; today Normandale annually enrolls more than 14,000 students. Normandale is a member of the Minnesota State Colleges and Universities system.

Campus

The campus is accessible to persons with disabilities, and features eight contemporary brick buildings around a central courtyard. These buildings include the following: Academic Partnership Center, Activities, Building Services, College Services, Fine Arts, Library, Science, and a newly renovated Student Center. The campus also features a Japanese Garden. The Academic Partnership Center is in conjunction with Minnesota State University, Mankato. A 727-space four story parking ramp opened in Fall 2012.

The Minnesota Japanese School, a weekend Japanese educational program, previously held its classes at the college. Additionally, Nine Mile Creek transects the college campus near East Marsh Lake Park's wetlands and was the initial site for their host city's "Adopt-A-Wetland" service learning prototype (2003–2004).

Accreditation
Normandale Community College is accredited by the Higher Learning Commission or HLC. Individual program accreditations include: American Dental Association, American Dietetic Association, Association of Collegiate Business Schools and Programs, Commission on Accreditation of Allied Health Education Programs, Minnesota State Board of Nursing, and the National League for Nursing. Normandale is one of only four community colleges across the nation that is now accredited in three Fine Arts areas: National Association of Schools of Music, National Association of Schools of Theatre, and the National Association of Schools of Art and Design.

Notable alumni
 Abdimalik Askar – A Minnesota politician, educator, and entrepreneur. In March 2014, he was officially endorsed as the Republican Party of Minnesota's candidate running for the Minnesota House of Representatives in Minneapolis' District 60B. He was also endorsed for the same seat in 2016.
 Roger Chamberlain – A Minnesota politician and member of the Minnesota Senate. As a member of the Republican Party of Minnesota, he represents District 38.
 Mary Liz Holberg - Member of the Dakota County, Minnesota Board of Commissioners, and former member of the Minnesota House of Representatives. A member of the Republican Party of Minnesota, she represented District 58A, which encompasses most of the city of Lakeville in Dakota County.
Dolal Idd - killed by Minneapolis police in a shootout on December 30, 2020
 Andrew Johnson – Minneapolis City Councilmember.
 Thomas E. Petersen, Commissioner of the Minnesota Department of Agriculture.
 A. J. Sass, youth LGBTQIA+ author.
 Chuck Schafer – former member of the Wisconsin State Assembly.

References

External links
 Official website

Community colleges in Minnesota
Universities and colleges in Bloomington, Minnesota
Two-year colleges in the United States
Educational institutions established in 1968
1968 establishments in Minnesota
New Ulm, Minnesota